The 2003 Winnipeg Blue Bombers finished in 2nd place in the West Division with an 11–7 record. They appeared in the West Semi-Final.

Offseason

CFL Draft

Regular season

Season standings

Season schedule

Playoffs

West Semi-Final

Awards and records

2003 CFL All-Stars
RB – Charles Roberts, CFL All-Star
DE – Daved Benefield, CFL All-Star

Western All-Star selections
RB – Charles Roberts, CFL Western All-Star
DE – Daved Benefield, CFL Western All-Star

References

Winnipeg Blue Bombers
Winnipeg Blue Bombers seasons